Patricia Scott AM (1926–2012) was an  Australian children's author and storyteller.

Life
Scott was one of Australia’s first professional storytellers.

Scott died in July 2012 aged 86.

Awards
1988 Dromkeen Medal
1991 Member of the Order of Australia

Works
Storytelling & reading aloud 
I had a little hen 
Pigs everywhere

References

External links 

Betty L. Criscoe Award-winning books for children and young adults: an annual guide, 1989 p48
Dromkeen Medal at Scholastic Australia
Children's literature La Trobe University
Scott, Patricia (1926-) NLA Trove

1926 births
2012 deaths
Australian children's writers
Members of the Order of Australia